Van Buren County Courthouse may refer to:

Van Buren County Courthouse (Arkansas)
Van Buren County Courthouse (Iowa), Keosauqua, Iowa
Van Buren County Courthouse (Michigan)